Legion of the Night is a 1995 horror film directed by Matt Jaissle, starring Tim Lovelace, Jeff Rector, Ron Asheton, Heather Fine, and S. William Hinzman. The film revolves around a scientist (Hinzman) who experiments with reanimation of corpses, accidentally creating zombies. This technology falls into the hands of a crime lord that uses it to create a near-invincible army of thugs. The film was released on DVD in the United Kingdom as Dead City.

See also
 List of zombie films

References

External links 

1995 horror films
1995 films
American zombie films
1990s English-language films
1990s American films